Anastasia Shishmakova (born ) is a Russian group rhythmic gymnast. She is a two-time (2018, 2019) World Group all-around champion and the 2018 European Group all-around champion.

Career
Anastasia took up rhythmic gymnastics at the age of 5 in her home town Seversk, Russia. She joined Russian National team in 2017 and won gold in Group All-around competition at Grand Prix Moscow in February. In September, Shishmakova and the Russian group won the Group All-Around title at the 2019 Rhythmic Gymnastics World Championships.

References

External links
 

2000 births
Living people
Russian rhythmic gymnasts
Gymnasts at the 2019 European Games
European Games medalists in gymnastics
European Games gold medalists for Russia
Medalists at the Rhythmic Gymnastics World Championships
Medalists at the Rhythmic Gymnastics European Championships
European Games bronze medalists for Russia